Bobolin refers to the following places in Poland:

 Bobolin, Police County
 Bobolin, Sławno County